Gegong Apang is an Indian politician from Arunachal Pradesh. He served as Chief Minister of Arunachal Pradesh from 18 January 1980 to 19 January 1999 and again from August 2003 to April 2007. Apang is Arunachal Pradesh's longest serving Chief Minister and also the fourth

 longest serving head of government of an Indian state after Pawan Kumar Chamling of Sikkim and Jyoti Basu of West Bengal as of 2019.

Political career
Gegong Apang started his political career as a member of the Congress Pradesh Council between 1972 and 1975 after passing out from JN College, Pasighat. He became the member of the first provisional Assembly between 1975-1978 and served as its agriculture minister in 1977. He was also elected to the first Legislative Assembly of the state in the year 1978 and was appointed its PWD and agriculture minister.  Apang won the 1978, 1980 and 1984 assembly elections from Yingkiong-Pangin Assembly Constituency. Later he won the 1990, 1995, 2000 and 2004 assembly elections from Upper Siang district's Tuting-Yingkiong  Assembly Constituency of Arunachal Pradesh. 
 
Apang was chosen as Chief Minister for first time on 18 January 1980, after getting elected to the assembly for second time.
He held the office until 1999, when he resigned, triggered by a no-confidence motion  by a split in the Congress Party.

He was elected leader of the newly formed United Democratic Front, a coalition of his own political party, the Arunachal Congress and several others, in 2003. Only a few months later, Apang and his supporting MLAs merged with the Bharatiya Janata Party, the first time the BJP had ever ruled a state in north-eastern India.  A few months after the BJP led National Democratic Alliance lost the 2004 general election, Apang returned to the Indian National Congress.  In October 2004, Congress won the majority in state assembly election, making  Apang return as the Chief Minister.  He was in office as Chief Minister till 9 April 2007, when Congress MLAs revolted against his leadership under Dorjee Khandu, who succeeded him as chief minister and Congress Legislature Party leader. Mr.Apang, out of four terms as Chief Minister, headed Congress Government for three terms and one term from Arunachal Congress, regional party floated by him in 1996, after differences with the then Prime Minister PV Narasimha Rao over his demand for deportation of the Chakma-Hajong refugees from the tribal state.

Apang resigned from the primary membership of the Indian National Congress on 17 February 2014 (party sources said) and joined the Bharatiya Janata Party on 20 February 2014 prior to Indian general election and Arunachal Pradesh legislative assembly election. 
On 15 January 2019 he resigned from primary membership of Bharatiya Janata Party (BJP) by saying that "BJP now platform to seek power."
. He joined Janata dal (Secular).

Corruption charges
Apang was arrested on 24 August 2010 for alleged involvement in 1000 crore Public Distribution System scam. Apang denied the charges and claimed they are politically motivated, though the government under Chief Minister Dorjee Khandu maintained that the investigation was conducted independently without political interference. The scam allegedly involves fraudulent hill transport subsidy bills that were paid without the required financial oversight while he was the chief minister.

Personal life
Apang was born on January 10, 1947, at Karko village in Upper Siang district. Apang is from Yingkiong, the headquarters of Upper Siang district in Arunachal Pradesh. He has three wives. One of Apang's sons was kidnapped at gun point in June 2008. Later that month he returned home safely, an unknown person to the Apang family who claimed to be of the same clan of Yadap Apang (Apang's wife) kidnapped him.

References

External links

 Apang returns to Congress

Frontline -  A defection drama

1949 births
Living people
Chief Ministers of Arunachal Pradesh
Chief ministers from Bharatiya Janata Party
India MPs 1998–1999
People from Upper Siang district
People from Yingkiong
Chief ministers from Indian National Congress
Bharatiya Janata Party politicians from Arunachal Pradesh
Janata Dal (Secular) politicians
People's Party of Arunachal politicians
Arunachal Congress politicians
Janata Party politicians
Indian National Congress politicians
State cabinet ministers of Arunachal Pradesh
Arunachal Pradesh MLAs 1978–1980
Arunachal Pradesh MLAs 1980–1984
Arunachal Pradesh MLAs 1984–1990
Arunachal Pradesh MLAs 1990–1995
Arunachal Pradesh MLAs 1995–1999
Arunachal Pradesh MLAs 1999–2004
Arunachal Pradesh MLAs 2004–2009